The Tokyo Gas Creators are an American football team located in Koto, Tokyo, Japan.  They are a member of the X-League.

Team history
1985 Team Founded.
1989 Joined the X-League X3 
1990 Promoted from X3 to X2
1991 Promoted from X2 to X1
1992 Placed 6th in the East Division. Demoted from X2 to X1 at the end of the season.
1994 Placed 1st in the X2 East division. Promoted from X2 to X1 for the following season.
2008 Team name changed to All Tokyo Gas Creators. Placed 5th in the Central division (1 win, 4 losses).
2009 Placed 6th in the East Division (1 win, 6 losses).
2010 Placed 4th in the Central division (3 wins, 4 losses).
2011 Placed 5th in the Central division (3 wins, 4 losses).
2012 Team name changed to Tokyo Gas Creators. Placed 4th in the Central division (4 wins, 3 losses).
2013 Kurt Rose hired as head coach. Placed 5th in the East division (3 wins, 4 losses).
2014 Placed 5th in the East division (3 wins, 4 losses).

Seasons
{| class="wikitable"
|bgcolor="#FFCCCC"|X-League Champions (1987–present)
|bgcolor="#DDFFDD"|<small>Division Champions</small>
|bgcolor="#D0E7FF"|Final Stage/Semifinals Berth
|bgcolor="#96CDCD"|Wild Card /2nd Stage Berth
|}

Current Import PlayersFormer Import players'''

References

External links
  (Japanese)

American football in Japan
Tokyo Gas Group
1985 establishments in Japan
American football teams established in 1985
X-League teams